Two Loves (French: Deux amours) is a 1949 French comedy film directed by Richard Pottier and starring Tino Rossi, Simone Valère and Édouard Delmont.

The film's sets were designed by the art director Paul-Louis Boutié.

Cast
 Tino Rossi as Sylvain Vincent / Désiré Vincent
 Simone Valère as Antoinette
 Édouard Delmont as M. Vincent 
 Sylvie as Mme Vincent
 André Gabriello as Caldebrousse 
 Jeanne Fusier-Gir as Poucette Caldebrousse
 André Brunot as Nestor, directeur du cirque
 Louis Florencie as Le maire 
 Henri Arius as Un client
 Christiane Barry as Carmen	
 José Casa as Un client
 Edith Cora as Anaïs
 Camille Guérini as Le régisseur
 Mag-Avril as Une commère
 Marcel Maupi as Dominique
 Geneviève Morel as Clémentine

References

Bibliography 
 Phil Powrie & Marie Cadalanu. The French Film Musical. Bloomsbury Publishing, 2020.

External links 
 

1949 films
French comedy films
1949 comedy films
1940s French-language films
Films directed by Richard Pottier
French black-and-white films
1940s French films